Leniewo  (Lenevo) is a village in the administrative district of Gmina Czyże, within Hajnówka County, Podlaskie Voivodeship, in north-eastern Poland.

According to the 1921 census, the village was inhabited by 157 people, among whom 2 were Roman Catholic, 149 Orthodox, and 6 Mosaic. At the same time, 11 inhabitants declared Polish nationality, 146 Belarusian. There were 36 residential buildings in the village.

The village has a population of 83.

References

Leniewo